The Mpondo People or simply AmaMpondo, is one of the kingdoms in what is now the Eastern Cape.
Having been established way back in the year 1228. The AmaMpondo Nation were first ruled by its founder who was King Mpondo kaNjanya who lived around (1205-1280) and later the 'AmaNyawuza'clan (a royal clan of the AmaMpondo), by nationality referred to themselves as 'AmaMpondo'. They are related to other AbaMbo kingdoms and chiefdoms in South Africa.

Origins

The story of the origins of emaMpondweni was told to personify and symbolise the fact that it was a nation with lands shaped like a horn, when it includes the lands emaMpondomiseni, and to make it easier for telling Iintsomi, meaning educative stories. Taking Mpondo as the son since it was used for defending and Mpondomise as the daughter since it was used for attacking and negotiation. Thus according to the Mpondo oral tradition, they are the legendary descendants of Mpondo, the grandson of Sibiside who was the leader of the once-powerful Mbo nation (AbaMbo or MaMbo). Mpondo people are part of AbaMbo group who are thought to have migrated from the Great Lakes into modern-day South Africa or the race of people coming from Ethiopia and along Zambia down past Eswatini, believed to be under the Great Kingdom of Kush. This is evident from the ruling plant in the coast south-east of Africa and north-west of Madagascar, the marijuana plant. It grows in abundance from emaMpondweni up the coast and the coast of Madagascar. It is through king Sibiside that Mpondo the forefather of the nation emerges together with other well-known nations. Mpondo people share a common lineage with AmaMpondomise, AmaXesibe, AbakwaMkhize, AmaBomvu and AmaBomvana.

Sibiside's offspring:
 Mavovo (Sibiside's heir and father of the Mkhize tribe)
 Gubhela (his descendants also call themselves abakwaMkhize)
 Nomafu (AmaBomvu and AmaBomvana)
 Njanya (AmaMpondo, AmaMpondomise, AmaXesibe)

Mpondo and Mpondomise were twins. There is an ongoing argument about the twin who was the eldest, the most commonly held view is that Mpondo is the senior twin. It is said that while out hunting, Mpondo killed a lion and refused to hand over the skin to Mpondomise as was the custom (the senior was entitled to skins of certain animals). The tension between the two started from that day and Mpondo and his followers were the first ones to leave and settle elsewhere away from their father's land.

Lineage of AmaMpondo kings from its founder
The great house of Mpondo is called Ndimakude Great Palace and is situated in Flagstaff, Eastern Cape. The right-hand house is called Nyandeni Great Place and is situated in Libode, Eastern Cape. The Nyandeni house enjoyed autonomy for decades and was often referred to as Western Mpondoland, while the Qawukeni house was referred to as Eastern Mpondoland.

The towns in the Mpondo kingdom include Lusikisiki, Siphaqeni (known as Flagstaff), Mbizana (erroneously called Bizana), Ntabankulu, Port St. Johns, Libode and Ngqeleni.

Mzintlava (now known as Kokstad) was allotted to Adam Kok of the Griquas.

Mpondo Kingship Line

Mpondo clans and tributary clans
There are three types of clans you find in Mpondoland (kwa-Mpondo/emaMpondweni) today. First, there clans that arise out of the many houses of the Kings listed in the section above (Mpondo's descendants). Secondly, there are clans of the older AbaMbo/MaMbo tribe from which Mpondo himself was born out, therefore these are people of his ancestors. Thirdly, there are clans/tribes who have immigrated to Mpondoland and now pay tribute to the Mpondo kingdom.

In more detail:

 From Sihula we have ImiQwane, AmaNtusi (The elder son called Mbangweni and the young brother called Gavu kaMbangweni)
 From Mthwa we have ImiThwa, AmaWoshe, AmaNgcwangule, AmaGingqi, AmaKhwalo
 From Mkhondwane we have AmaNtlane, AmaValela, AmaGcuda
 From Sukude we have AmaSame, AmaNcenjane
 From Cabe we have AmaCabe, AmaTshomane, AmaDwera, AmaQhiya, AmaNjilo, AmaGqwaru, AmaNqanda
 From Gangatha we have AmaGangatha, ImiCapathi
 From Bhala we have AmaBhala, AmaChithwayo, AmaKhonjwayo, AmaHeleni, AmaNgcoya, AmaNyathi, AmaJola (not to be confused with AmaMpondomise clan)
 From Ndayini we have AmaNdayini
 From Thahle we have AmaThahle
 From Nyawuza we have AmaNyawuza, amaFaku, oNgqungqushe.

Some of the following clans were followers of Mpondo kings from the beginning, some only came later during the reign of Faku:

AmaYalo
AmaMpisi 
AmaNgcikwa
AmaKhanyayo
ImiZizi
AmaNtshangase 
AmaKhwetshube
AmaNgutyana
Izilangwe (lineage of the silangwe clan according to the oral history) SILANGWE is /was the head and the founder of abakwaSilangwe clan, here are his descendants /offsprings that took over from him,

CHUSHELA kaSILANGWE,
SOTHONGOTHI kaCHUSHELA,
MBHABHAMA kaSOTHONGOTHI,
NTOBELA kaMBHABHAMA,
NDUKUDE kaNTOBELA,
NTAMONDE kaNDUKUDE,
MSUTHU ka NTAMONDE,
SIWISA ka MSUTHU,
Silangwe was also known by isikhahlelo/salute or praise name VALANGOMKHONTW'MNYANGO which translate (Block the entry by a spear). He was one of the great warriors of abambo/abasembo tribe where one had to lead and guide his clan against imminent intruders.

AmaXolo 
AmaDiba
AmaNci
AmaCwera 
AmaXhate
AmaMpinge
Omaduna
AmaXhosa
AmaZulu
AmaSwati
AbeSotho

Tributary clans
These tribes/ clans are not unique to Mpondoland, they usually are small groups in Mpondoland who left their tribes/kingdoms having been given land by Mpondo Kings and thus recognised as forming part of AmaMpondo Kingdom and paying tribute to Mpondo Kings.

 AmaTolo 
 AmaZizi 
 Bakwena (Sotho)
 Amahlabe
 Other small groups from other kingdoms

Causes

There were varying reasons that led to the revolts notably the land rehabilitation programme, the Bantu Authorities System and the increase in taxes.

The land rehabilitation programme 
The land rehabilitation programme was a system that entailed the colonisers keeping the fertile soils to themselves and allocating the less fertile lands to the local people. The Mpondo people revolted against this.

The Bantu Authorities System 
This system brought about tension between the people of Pondoland and their chiefs.
The Bantu Authorities System created a pseudo sense of power as colonial authorities gave chiefs limited power, ensuring that administrative duties were still being assigned to the colonial government. This disrupted the system as people were used to being consulted at the Inkundla before decisions were made. Inkundla was when members of a community met together to discuss issues affecting the district/area and made decisions.

Series of events leading to the 1960 revolts 
The first signs of revolt were apparent through local vigilante groups such as the Makhuluspani. The Makhuluspani was a group that was created in a bid to combat stock theft in the districts of Tsolo and Qumbu in the 1950s. It is reported that these groups targeted headmen and chiefs who were cooperating or suspected to be cooperating with the colonial government. There were also conflicts around the Bizana area during that same year as the government intended to fence off a certain area on the coastal area to reserve the forests and coastal zones without having consulted the people of Pondoland. People were evicted out of their land, and at one stage during evictions police were attacked.

In 1959, in the Bizana district, Saul Mabude who was the chairman of the district authority and advocate for the Bantu Authorities system was asked to meet with the people of that community. He was tasked with explaining the Bantu Authorities system to them, however he did not show up as he feared for his life. The consequence to his actions resulted in him having his house burnt and the police terrorizing the people in that area. This did not deter the Pondo people from mobilising against the government, who made it clear to Chief Sigcau, who was the King at the time that the Bantu system was not going to be enforced on their watch.

In June 1960 a meeting was called at Ngquza Hill. These meetings had become the norm during the apartheid era around that area as people used them to educate each other on the events that were taking place, thus the meetings on the hill were not held secretly. The police were tipped about the meeting, who in turn upon their arrival fired on the people at the hill. This resulted in the arrest of 23 people and the death of 11 people. In retaliation, there was an ambush on a police patrol in Flagstaff. These people were shot at by the police, resulting in the injury of two policemen and the arrest of one headman.

In November 1960 in Flagstaff, a mass meeting was called at Ngqanduli. Chief Vukayibambe called the police and helped disperse the meeting. One of the protesters was killed, this resulting in Vukayibambe's kraal being set on fire and his death. All those who had an affiliation with the chief and supported him were killed, injured and their kraals set alight. The police were sent to defuse the situation.

Stabilisation of the revolts 
A commission of inquiry was held right after the massacre. The demands from the people of Pondoland entailed the Bantu Authorities, Bantu Education Acts being withdrawn, the relief from taxes. Their demands were not met, and in retaliation the Pondo boycotted all white owned stores in Pondoland.

By the end of November 1960, a state of emergency was declared in Pondoland, in Flagstaff, Bizana, Tabankulu, Lusikisiki and Mount Ayliff. No one could access those areas without a permit, and the west of Umtata was closed off. The revolts were shut down through heavy policing and raiding tax evaders. The Bantu Home Guard was also established by the chiefs in a bid to shut down the revolts, with the aid of the military force that was sent by the state in a bid to subjugate the areas in Pondoland where the revolts had occurred until 1963.

In 1960, a total of 4,769 had been imprisoned during this period of the revolts from 1950 and 1960, and 2,067 brought to trial and it is reported that 30 people were sentenced to death during August and October in 1961.

Arts and entertainment
The Mpondo people are one of the major tribes that produce and consumes the genre of music called Maskandi but the Mpondo people are unique in a performance of ukusina(Nguni dance) and their own traditional dance called "imfene" (baboon dance). This dance(imfene) is performed by young ones and adults of both sexes to the sounds of Maskandi music.

Mpondo Culture and Heritage Festival

Mpondo Culture and Heritage Festival is celebrated annually by Mpondo to celebrate their culture and heritage. It is the biggest cultural event celebrated in the Kingdom attended by approximately over 20,000 people preceded by the Annual Mpondo Reed Dance. It is held in September of every year at Lwandlolubomvu Great Place, Ntabankulu; palace of the customary head Jongilanga Sigcau. Ntabankulu is the mountainous part of the Mpondo Kingdom surrounded by the great Mzimvubu River. Ntabankulu in Mpondo language means 'Big Mountains'. September is important in Mpondo history as it was originally the Mpondo new year in the ancient Mpondo calendars and also two of the Mpondo Kings King Mqikela and King Sigcau were born on this month. The Mpondo culture and Heritage Festival also celebrates the roles played by these icons, including the legendary kings Faku, Mqikela, Sigcau, Marhelane amongst others. This events also seeks to promote cultural diversity through sharing of Mpondo culture and heritage with other cultures from South Africa, broader African continent and beyond the oceans. It attracts a lot of tourists, both local and international, and is one of the biggest events in the Eastern Cape Province of South Africa.

Lunar Calendar

According to the ancient AbaMbo people, including Mpondo September is the first month of the year. There are some Mpondo people who recognise the appearance of the Pleiades ("isilimela") to signal the beginning of the year, but it is most likely that this interpretation was adopted from the sotho people. Mpondo calendar is as follows commencing with uMphanda the first month of the year according to the ancient Mpondo Calendar.

uMphanda (September)
uZibandlela (October)
uLwezi (November)
uNtsinga (December)
uNtlolanja (January)
uNdazosela (February)
um'Basa (March)
uMgudlula (April)
uNtlangula (May)
uNtulikazi (June)
uNcwabakazi (July)
uMfumfu (August)

Notable Mpondo leaders

 Winnie Madikizela-Mandela – South African politician
 Gquma, alias Bessie, a white woman who served as queen of the Tshomane Mpondo after her marriage to King Sango.
 Nkosi Ntsikayezwe Sigcau – son of Botha Sigcau and ANC liberation activist.
 Stella Sigcau – former ANC MP
 Oliver Tambo – former and longest-serving president of the ANC
 Dali Tambo – the son of Oliver Tambo
 Nomatemba Tambo – the daughter of Oliver Tambo
 Rev. Makhenkesi Stofile – the second Premier of the Eastern Cape
 Lulu Dikana – Musician
 Zonke Dikana – Musician
 Simphiwe Dana – Musician
 Miriam Makeba – Musician
 Mtutuzeli Madlebe – Musician

See also
Botha Sigcau
Tutor Nyangelizwe Vulindlela Ndamase
Faku kaNgqungqushe
Ngqungqushe kaNyawuza
Ndamase
Sigcau
Isinuka Mud Caves and Sulphur Pools
List of current constituent African monarchs
Mpondoland
Mpondomise people
Mpondo Revolt (1950–1962)
Xhosa clan names

References

Ethnic groups in South Africa